Radius Travel is a privately held global travel management company with headquarters in Washington, DC, USA. Radius designs and delivers travel programs for multinational companies through a network of travel agencies. The Radius network is made up of 100+ agencies and manages over US$30 billion of annual corporate travel spending.

The company has existed in its present form since 1992 as a result of a merger between two independent North American travel management companies.

In 2018, Radius Travel was acquired by Travel and Transport, a U.S.-based travel management company.

References

External links
 

Travel and holiday companies of the United States